The 1L6 is a 7 pin miniature vacuum tube of the pentagrid converter type. It was developed in the United States by Sylvania. It is very similar electrically to its predecessors, the Loktal-based 1LA6 and 1LC6. Released in 1949 for the Zenith Trans-Oceanic shortwave portable radio, this tube was in commercial production until the early 1960s .

The 1L6 was to be a specialty tube, produced in small quantities by very few manufacturers, mostly Sylvania for use by just a few manufacturers of shortwave portables, such  as Zenith - in their Trans-Oceanics - and its short-lived rivals, such as the Hallicrafters TW-1000 and the RCA Strat-O-World and  very few others. In fact, Zenith, Crosley and more than a few others used it in many radios. 1L6 based multi-band radios were made by Crosley, Airline (Montgomery Ward house-brand), Silvertone (Sears house brand), Hallicrafters, FADA, and several others. When the US military commissioned two versions of the Trans-Oceanics, they stockpiled 1L6s in the uncounted thousands, some of which still show up at surplus sales.

It was offered to Zenith by Sylvania in place of the larger 1LA6 - for which Zenith made production line changes as the first Miniature-Tube T/O was starting production. The original G500 chassis was punched for a Locktal socket, Zenith changed the phenolic wafer socket to accommodate the smaller tube. NOTE: a 1LA6 (or a 1LC6) will work as a near drop-in replacement for the 1L6 with the use of an adapter socket.

The closest European analog to the 1L6 is the DK92.

See also
List of vacuum tubes

References

External links
 1L6 Tube at the Radio Museum

Vacuum tubes